The Night Flyer is a 1928 American silent drama film directed by Walter Lang. A print of the film exists in the film archive of the Library of Congress. Parts of the film were shot in Thistle, Utah.

Cast
 William Boyd as Jimmy Bradley
 Jobyna Ralston as Kate Murphy
 Philo McCullough as Bat Mullins
 Anne Schaefer as Mrs. Murphy (as Ann Schaeffer)
 DeWitt Jennings as Bucks
 John Millerta as Tony
 Robert Dudley as Freddy

References

External links
 
The Night Flyer at SilentEra

1928 films
1928 drama films
Silent American drama films
American silent feature films
1920s English-language films
American black-and-white films
Films directed by Walter Lang
Films shot in Utah
Pathé Exchange films
1920s American films